The 2nd Tank Regiment is an inactive tank regiment of the Italian Army based in San Vito al Tagliamento in Friuli Venezia Giulia. Originally the regiment, like all Italian tank units, was part of the infantry, but on 1 June 1999 it became part of the cavalry. Operationally the regiment was last assigned to the Mechanized Brigade "Gorizia".

History

Interwar years 
The regiment was formed on 15 September 1936 in Montorio Veronese as 2nd Tank Infantry Regiment with four battalions: IV, V, and XI assault tanks battalions and the III Breach Tanks Battalion. The assault tanks battalions fielded L3/35 tankettes, while the breach tanks battalion fielded Fiat 3000 light tanks. The regiment's structure at its foundation was as follows:

 2nd Tank Infantry Regiment, in Verona
 IV Assault Tanks Battalion "Monti", in Bolzano (L3/35 tankettes) 
 V Assault Tanks Battalion "Venezian", in Trieste (L3/35 tankettes)
 XI Assault Tanks Battalion "Gregorutti", in Udine (L3/35 tankettes)
 III Breach Tanks Battalion, in Verona (Fiat 3000 light tanks)
 2nd Tank Training Center, in Verona
 2nd Tank Materiel Maintenance Workshop, in Verona

The regiment was renamed 32nd Tank Infantry Regiment on 1 December 1938.

Cold War 
On 24 May 1964 the army raised the XXII Tank Battalion "Serenissima" in San Vito al Tagliamento, which on 25 October 1964 entered the newly raised Lagunari Regiment "Serenissima". The battalion's number was chosen to commemorate the XXII Tank Battalion "L", which had operated in Italian Libya in the interwar years and had entered the 33rd Tank Infantry Regiment on 6 November 1939. With the regiment the battalion operated in Dalmatia and Venezia Giulia in 1940, before being sent to North Africa for the Western Desert Campaign.

22nd Tank Battalion "M.O. Piccinini" 
During the 1975 army reform the Lagunari Regiment "Serenissima" was disbanded on 20 October 1975 and its XXII Tank Battalion became the 22nd Tank Battalion "M.O. Piccinini". As the flag of the 2nd Tank Infantry Regiment had passed to the 32nd Tank Regiment, the 22nd Piccinini was granted a new flag and a coat of arms on 12 November 1976 by decree 846 of the President of the Italian Republic Giovanni Leone.

Tank and armored battalions created during the 1975 army reform were all named for officers, soldiers and partisans, who were posthumously awarded Italy's highest military honor the Gold Medal of Military Valour during World War II. The 22nd Tank Battalion's name commemorated IV Tank Battalion "M14/41", 133rd Tank Infantry Regiment Captain Vittorio Piccinini, who was killed in action on 25 October 1942 during the Second Battle of El Alamein. Equipped with Leopard 1A2 main battle tanks the battalion joined the Mechanized Brigade "Gorizia".

For its conduct and work after the 1976 Friuli earthquake the battalion was awarded a Bronze Medal of Army Valour, which was affixed to the battalion's flag and added to the battalion's coat of arms.

In 1992 the battalion was elevated to regiment without changing size or organization, but already in 1995 the regiment was disbanded and its flag transferred to the Shrine of the Flags in the Vittoriano in Rome.

References

Tank Regiments of Italy